This is a list of media and materials related to the anime series Red Garden.

Anime 

The anime Red Garden is done by GONZO and directed by Ko Matsuo. It began broadcasting in Japan on October 3, 2006, on TV Asahi.

The English version the anime is licensed by Funimation. It was licensed before by ADV Films. Red Garden is a DVD-only series and also ran on the specialty service The Anime Network.

Voice actors

The Four Girls and their Friend 
 Kate Ashley - Akira Tomisaka (Japanese), Melissa Davis (English)
 Rachel Benning - Ryoko Shintani (Japanese), Maggie Flecknoe (English)
 Claire Forrest - Miyuki Sawashiro (Japanese), Kara Greenberg (English)
 Rose Sheedy - Ayumi Tsuji (Japanese), Brittney Karbowski (English)
 Lise Harriette Meyer - Misato Fukuen (Japanese), Taylor Hannah (English)

Animus 
 Lula Ferhlan - Rie Tanaka (Japanese), Shelley Calene-Black (English)
 J.C. - Takashi Kondo (Japanese), Chris Patton (English)
 Lucy - Sawa Ishige (Japanese), Shannon Emerick (English)

Doral 
 Hervé Girardot - Takehito Koyasu (Japanese), Jose Diaz (Ep. 1-16), Quentin Haag (Ep. 17-22) (English)
 Raul Girardot - Sukekiyo Kameyama (Japanese), Rob Mungle (English)
 Anna Girardot - Nozomi Masu (Japanese), Serena Varghese (English)
 Emilio Girardot - Wataru Hatano (Japanese), Leraldo Anzaldua (English)
 Mirielle Girardot - Rikako Yamaguchi (Japanese), Stephanie Wittels (English)
 Dr. Bender - Ryou Sugisaki (Japanese), Todd Waite (English)

Grace 
 The Director - Sho Saito (Japanese), Marcy Bannor (English)
 Paula Sinclair - Megumi Kobayashi (Japanese), Lesley Tesh (English)
 Jessica - Saori Goto (Japanese), Jessica Boone (English)
 Kerry - Nanae Inoue (Japanese), Bree Welch (English)

Friends of the Girls 
 Amanda - Haruka Kimura (Japanese), Elizabeth Bunch (English)
 Luke - Yuuki Masuda (Japanese), Illich Guardiola (English)
 Nick - Daisuke Ono (Japanese), Jacob A. Gragard (English)
 Sam - Shuma Shiratori (Japanese), Amit Patel (English)
 Susan - Omi Minami (Japanese), Cynthia Martinez (English)
 Vanessa - Sakura Matsumoto (Japanese), Monica Rial (English)
 Juan - Toshinobu Iida (Japanese), Andrew Love (English)
 Sarah - Mizuki Fujita (Japanese), Kim-Ly Nguyen (English)

Family 
 Kate's Father - Yoji Ueda (Japanese), Chris Hutchison (English)
 Kate's Mother - Haruhi Terada (Japanese), Christine Auten (English)
 Emma Ashley - Ryoko Nagata (Japanese), Emily Carter-Essex (English)
 Rachel's Mother - Rei Igarashi (Japanese), Allison Sumrall (Ep. 4), Tamara Levine (Ep. 5+) (English)
 Claire's Father - Takaya Kuroda (Japanese), Justin Doran (English)
 Randy Forrest - Hisao Egawa (Japanese), Vic Mignogna (English)
 Rose's Mother - Masami Toyoshima (Japanese), Donna Hannah (English)
 Robert Sheedy - Shōto Kashii (Japanese), Ernie Manouse (English)
 Carrie Sheedy - Sumire Morohashi (Japanese), Hilary Haag (English)
 Paul Sheedy - Yuutaro Motoshiro (Japanese), Shannon Emerick (English)
 Robert Mayer - Tarou Masuoka (Japanese), Charles C. Campbell (English)

The Police 
 Claude - Shinpachi Tsuji (Japanese), John Swasey (English)
 Neil - Yoji Ueda (Japanese), Eddie Shannon, Jr. (English)

Red Garden Region 1 DVD Releases

Music

Theme music

Red Garden Original Soundtrack 

Main Theme ~ Sou de aru to negau kara 	
Kojin no shi 	
Nasu koto toshite 	
Ayumi .. Yamerarezu ni 	
Yowaku, yowaku 	
Shizuka ni omou koto 	
Sono saki ni mieta kara, zutto zutto 	
Omoi omoi, soko ni... 	
Soshite mata, to 	
Eirei 	
Miete kuru mono e 	
Seinen no kao to akai-iro 	
Tsunagari no houkai 	
Fukanzen naru mono 	
Hai iro no shiawase 	
Konnichiwa owari da kara 	
Mienai hikari 	
Anata to ita kara mieta koto 	
Utsukushiku to mo mitomezu 	
Owari kara no ippo 	
Susumu, soshite susumu 	
Kireru Ishi 	
Te no kasanari 	
Akai Niwa 	
Ai ~ Wazuka na omoide / KOKIA 	
Katsu ~ Mabara na hikari / KOKIA 	
Kurenai ~ Negai / KOKIA 	
Sumire ~ You to tomo ni / KOKIA 	
Shiro ~ Watashi-tachi no hibiki / KOKIA

Manga 
The manga version is published by Gentosha Comics and is drawn by Kirihito Ayamura.  It began serialization in the seinen manga magazine Comic Birz on August 30, 2006.  The first tankōbon was released on February 24, 2007, the second one on September 22, 2007, and the third one on March 24, 2008.

External links 
 Official site
 Official English site

Media Information